España 2000 (E-2000) is a far-right political party in Spain which has never obtained national or regional parliamentary representation. The last time it ran for General elections was in 2011, where it obtained 9266 votes out of a total of 24,590,557 valid votes.

The French Front National assisted and supported the party at its national congress.

Ideology
España 2000 defines itself as socially and democratically populist. It advocates a mixture of social democracy and conservatism centering on the defense of the traditional family.

Key features of the party's platform include:  
 tighter control of Spanish borders to prevent illegal immigration,   
 the immediate expulsion of illegal immigrants,   
 giving native Spaniards priority access to jobs,  
 more social spending, including investment in public education and protected housing, 
 better salaries and labor conditions for the working class,
 more investment in the police and military,
 a public banking system,  
 abolition of the D'Hondt method, and  
 establishment of a more democratic voting system.

España 2000 opposes economic and real estate speculation. It shares some social conservative values set forth by the Traditionalist Catholic Church with most of the conservative parties in Latin Europe, like Partido Popular in Spain or Popolo della Libertà in Italy.

Political parties with similar ideology in Spain include Falange Española de las JONS, FE-La Falange, Fuerza Nueva, Arbil, Democracia Nacional and the more moderate national Catholic Partido Demócrata Español.

Leaders and prominent members

Its leader is José Luis Roberto, lawyer and general secretary of the Asociación Nacional de Empresarios de Locales de Alterne.

Roberto, who is also a self-described "entrepreneur", owns the security firm Levantina de Seguridad (the "de facto" security syndicate in Valencia) and the law firm Roberto & Salazar, having representation in Madrid, Barcelona, and Valencia with at least 30 lawyers in office. He also owns several gyms in Valencia, Andalusia and Catalonia, among them Valencian Gym Levantina, which was investigated for some time in relation to illegal valetudo "championships", and military surplus stores held responsible for furnishing a large part of the Madrid local police uniforms. One of Roberto's gyms, Chute Boxe, held valetudo courses for the police, funded with public money and organized by the Sindicato Independiente de Policía. José Luis Roberto was arrested, although never formally indicted, during the Spanish Transition, in connection to two terrorist actions against independentist meetings held in Valencia. He has been consistently accused, albeit without proofs, of founding and partially funding marginal far-right groups such as Acción Radical Frente Antisistema. Permanently based in Valencia, he has published articles in local newspapers such as Las Provincias, Diario de Valencia and Levante, among them the infamous Yo también tengo libros nazis ("I also own Nazi books"). He has been constantly sued and criticized by anti-racist and anti-fascist organizations for engaging in hate speech and Ms. Pena is racist, xenophobic and pro-Nazi apology, allowing open signs of bigotry from members and supporters in his party's meetings.

Two quotes by Roberto, perhaps indicative of his and the party's ideology, are the following:
 ¿Tu admitirías que tu mujer diese a luz si la hubiese violado un moro? Yo no. (...) Por eso España 2000 esta a favor de que se legisle el aborto en casos extraordinarios al igual que la Eutanasia. ("would you consent to your wife having her baby had she been raped by a Moor? I wouldn't. (...) That's why España 2000 is pro-choice under extraordinary circumstances, as it is in favour of euthanasia).
La religión del Islam es un cáncer para la sociedad europea. ("Islam is a cancer to European society").

Ernesto Milá was recently appointed as the party's press secretary, and appeared in the election list for the 2008 General Election, ostensibly an attempt to gain preponderance over other neo-fascist groups in Spain by capitalizing on Milá's extensive history. Known for his past membership in the Partido Español Nacional Socialista (PENS), Fuerza Nueva and, later on, its splinter group, the Frente de Juventudes, Milá was one of the members of the fringe right-wing extremist groups (usually named incontrolados, "uncontrolled elements") who rallied against leftist or pro-democratic meetings during late Francoism, usually assuming the role of unofficial mob breakers and violent counter-rioters. Although the PENS terrorist attacks on Catalan libraries (such as the Cinc d'Oros, 1971) and libraries and public centers in València (1975), among others, were usually not prosecuted, a thwarted attempt on the Union of the Democratic Centre (Spain) headquarters, however, resulted in a formal indictment and forced Milá to flee for France. After a stay in Bolivia, where he worked as an adviser for the short-lived Luis García Meza Tejada dictatorship along with infamous neo-fascists such as Stefano delle Chiaie and war criminal Klaus Barbie, he returned to Spain.
Widely considered the most intellectually ambitious and well-connected of all Spanish neo-fascists who have escaped successful legal prosecution, Milá is nowadays devoted to "cultural" dissertations about diverse topics held dear by the far right in his blog.

Public profile
The group organized demonstrations in districts of Valencia, such as Ruzafa or Velluters places with a considerable immigrant population. As said above, José Luis Roberto was accused by SOS Racismo and others of racism and hate speech, although the judge ruled out said accusations under the justification that the slurs and racist expressions uttered during the gatherings were "mere generic disqualifications".

He has also organized soccer matches under the slogan Los españoles primero ("Spaniards first"), alleging that Latino bands were "de facto" owners of the soccer courts and held a veto over the admission of other players: not only that was never confirmed but also it appears that the districts where said games were played have a reputation for being prone to rather low levels of conflict. They also run a homeless shelter and a cafeteria.

Every 12 October, the group's supporters gather to demonstrate in Valencia, starting in front of the statue of El Cid and finishing in front of the statue of James I the Conqueror. Slogans uttered by demonstrators at these meetings include "Moros no, España no es un zoo" (No to Moors, Spain is not a zoo) and "España es una y no cincuenta y una" (Spain is one, not a hundred and one). During the 2007 march, attendance exceeded 1,000 people (2,000 according to police sources). At the 2007 event, protestors burned pictures of the chairman of Esquerra Republicana de Catalunya, Josep-Lluís Carod-Rovira, and of the Basque lehendakari, Juan José Ibarretxe, chanted En España los españoles primero: contra la inmigración ilegal y en defensa de nuestros derechos (In Spain the Spaniards come first: against illegal immigration and in defence of our rights), and displayed ETA emblems such as 'Menos pateras, que cierren las fronteras''.

The party has also contested elections with minimal success. In the 2008 General Election, for example, the party polled 7,543 votes, or 0.03% of the total. However, in 2007 they gained their first elected representative when they won a council seat in Silla, a town south of Valencia city

In the 2011 municipal elections, España 2000 won five council seats. A councillor in Onda with 649 votes (5.05%), one in Dos Aguas with 66 votes (12.43%), two in Silla (Valencia) with 997 votes (9.56%) and one in Alcalá de Henares with 4,541 votes (5.18%).

The party kept their single city councillor in Alcalá de Henares after the 2015 municipal election, while making advances in other municipalities of the Henares industrial corridor, namely 3 in Los Santos de la Humosa, 1 in Velilla de San Antonio and another in San Fernando de Henares. E-2000 also obtained 1 councillor in Silla, 1 down from 2011.

Election results

Congress of Deputies / Senate

See also
 National Democracy (Spain)

References

External links
Website of España 2000

Spanish nationalism
Eurosceptic parties in Spain
Far-right political parties in Spain
2002 establishments in Spain
Political parties established in 2002
Right-wing populist parties